The Indian Film and TV Producers Council (IFTPC) is a trade association in India.  It was previously known as the Association of Motion Pictures and TV Programme Producers (AMPTPP).

Pahlaj Nihalani was the president of the then AMPTPP for 29 years until 2009.

, its president was Sajid Nadiadwala.

See also
 Federation of Western India Cinema Employees
 Cinema of India

References

External links 
 Official website

Trade associations based in India
Film organisations in India
Film industry in India